The 1916 United States presidential election in Arkansas took place on November 7, 1916, as part of the 1916 United States presidential election. State voters chose nine representatives, or electors, to the Electoral College, who voted for president and vice president.

Background
Except for the Unionist Ozark counties of Newton and Searcy where Republicans controlled local government, Arkansas since the end of Reconstruction had been a classic one-party Democratic “Solid South” state. Disfranchisement during the 1890s of effectively all black people and most poor white people had meant that outside those two aberrant counties, the Republican Party was completely moribund and Democratic primaries the only competitive elections. Although the northwest of the state was to develop a strong Socialist Party movement that served as a swing vote in county elections, political repression and internal party divisions diminished that party's strength substantially.

The Democratic Party, under the influence of future federal Senate Minority and Majority Leader Joseph Taylor Robinson and demagogic Governor and Senator Jeff Davis, was to make many familiar progressive changes in railroad regulation and child labor, but under the administration of George W. Donaghey – who saw his administration and Democratic primary candidacy as a fight against the “Davis Machine” – more rapid development occurred, especially in abolishing convict leasing and improving bank regulation.

Vote
Arkansas voted powerfully for the Democratic nominee, incumbent President Woodrow Wilson, over the Republican nominee, Supreme Court justice Charles Evans Hughes. Wilson was aided by his support for Prohibition and opposition to involvement in World War I.

Results

Results by county

See also
 United States presidential elections in Arkansas

References

Arkansas
1916